A line producer is a type of film or television producer who is the head of the production office management personnel during daily operations of a feature film, advertisement film, television film, or TV program. A line producer usually works on one film or episode of a TV program at a time. They are responsible for human resources and handling any problems that come up during production. Line producers also manage scheduling and the budget of a motion picture, as well as day-to-day physical aspects of the film production.

Responsibilities
According to Producers Guild of America (PGA) guidelines, the line producer is the individual who reports directly to the individual(s) receiving "Produced by" credit on the theatrical motion picture and is the single individual who has the primary responsibility for the logistics of the production, from pre-production through completion of production; all department heads report to the line producer.

The line producer functions like a chief operations officer in running the production company. During pre-production, responsibilities include supervising the assembly of the shooting company, recruitment of key personnel and services, and production organization for how to shoot the script and transform it into a movie. The line producer plans start dates for everyone and everything, and monitors the budget in the lead up to picture. Film production generally follows a rigorous schedule. The line producer facilitates location scouting, set building and decorating, offices and stages, wardrobe, props, stunts, physical and visual effects, camera, lighting, rigging, transportation, crew and union relations, travel, cast and crew accommodation, contracting of legal permissions and agreements, safety and risk management, prep and shooting schedule. In short, the line producer oversees the joint planning, negotiations, implementation and accounting for production.

In the studio system, the line producer reports to the studio and typically liaises with key executives of production divisions inside the studio such as physical production, legal, labor relations, insurance, and finance. The line producer supports the director's vision and direct influence on the creative expression or narrative of the film. Although it could be argued that, through a line producer's ability to influence aspects of the film, like allocation of resources to certain departments, they can change important aspects of the film that have creative consequences, e.g., production value. For example, they can affect the project's look by influencing the choice of filming locations. While the director is in charge of all purely artistic decisions, the line producer helps to substantiate the director's creative ideas by taking care of logistics and related issues. From pre-production through principal photography, the line producer oversees the production budget and physical needs of the shoot.  By the first day of production, several versions of the budget have usually been drafted. A finalized or "locked" budget is the basis for the production to move forward. A key objective of a line producer is to respect this "locked" budget and deliver in time.

While in production, the line producer oversees the execution of many decisions that must be made to deliver each day's shoot.  The administrative aspects, especially those that have any financial impact, are all crucial areas of the line producer's work.  These areas include but are not limited to negotiating compensation (usually during pre-production) of crew members (both for union and non-union productions) and resolving daily production issues (in conjunction with the first assistant director and possibly the unit production manager). Moreover, they provide demanded equipment. If required, they handle unanticipated scheduling changes and serve "as a liaison between the crew and the producer."

Becoming a line producer
Line producers usually come from the ranks of assistant directors and unit production managers, giving them a strong background in the logistics of filmmaking and time management. It is common for them to continue to perform in one of those roles on projects they line-produce. They do not necessarily attend a film school.

References

External links
Line Producer TV/Film at http://www.careerdirections.ie

Entertainment occupations
Mass media occupations
Filmmaking occupations